Below is a list of museums in South Sudan.

List
 South Sudan National Museum
Remembering the Ones We Lost Museum

See also
 List of museums
 List of museums in Sudan

External links
 Museums in South Sudan
 AfricaKnows South Sudan Museum listings

South Sudan
Museums
Lists of organisations based in South Sudan
South Sudan
Museums